Zhydachiv Raion was a raion in Lviv Oblast in western Ukraine. Its administrative center was the city of Zhydachiv. The raion was abolished on 18 July 2020 as part of the administrative reform of Ukraine, which reduced the number of raions of Lviv Oblast to seven. The area of Zhydachiv Raion was merged into Stryi Raion.

It was established in 1939.

At the time of disestablishment, the raion consisted of four hromadas:
 Hnizdychiv settlement hromada with the administration in the urban-type settlement of Hnizdychiv;
 Khodoriv urban hromada with the administration in the city of Khodoriv;
 Zhuravne settlement hromada with the administration in the urban-type settlement of Zhuravne;
 Zhydachiv urban hromada with the administration in Zhydachiv.

Settlements 

Cities
 Khodoriv
 Zhydachiv

Urban-type settlements:

 Hnizdychiv
 Novi Strilyshcha
 Zhuravne

Villages (some):

 Makhlynets
 Oblaznytsia

See also
 Administrative divisions of Lviv Oblast

References

External links
 gska2.rada.gov.ua 

Former raions of Lviv Oblast
1939 establishments in Ukraine
Ukrainian raions abolished during the 2020 administrative reform